Luminiferous is the seventh studio album by American heavy metal band High on Fire, released on June 23, 2015, through Entertainment One Music. The album was produced by Kurt Ballou who handled production on the band's previous release, De Vermis Mysteriis (2012). The gap between these albums is the longest for High on Fire.

Reception

Luminiferous was met with critical acclaim. The album received an average score of 82/100 from 13 reviews on Metacritic, indicating "universal acclaim". Thom Jurek of AllMusic praised the album, writing, "One reason that High on Fire don't get accused of resting on their laurels is that they always come out hungry, anxious to refine their sound and remove anything that is not absolutely essential to their purposes. Luminiferous accomplishes that as well." Writing for Pitchfork, Grayson Haver Currin called the album "masterful" and said, "Featuring mammoth riffs and hooks, it feels like a classic compendium of High on Fire's successes." Denise Falzon of Exclaim! wrote, "Heavy metal at its finest, Luminiferous is a brilliant, dynamic release, showcasing High on Fire's penchant for diverse, thoughtful songwriting and impeccable musicianship." In his review of the album, Richard Giraldi of PopMatters considered Luminiferous nothing new, but still extremely refined and "some of the finest metal on the planet". In a more lukewarm review, Now's John Semley considered the album a passable distraction while Pike's other band, Sleep worked on their reformation.

After its release, Luminiferous appeared on several year-end lists.

Accolades

Track listing

Personnel
Credits adapted from liner notes.

High on Fire
Matt Pike – lead vocals, guitar
Jeff Matz – bass, backing vocals, bağlama (7)
Des Kensel – drums, backing vocals

Guest musicians
Kurt Ballou – backing vocals (4)
Robert Cheeseman – backing vocals (4)
Jason Zucco – backing vocals (4)
Scott Evans – backing vocals (4)

Technical personnel
Kurt Ballou – production, recording, mixing
Robert Cheeseman – engineering assistance
Jordan Barlow – illustrations
Paul Grosso – creative direction
Andrew Kelley – art direction, design

References

2015 albums
High on Fire albums
Albums produced by Kurt Ballou